Symphoromyia crassicornis  is a species of 'snipe flies' belonging to the family Rhagionidae.

This species is present in most of Europe.

Description 
Symphoromyia crassicornis  is 8 mm. long, and robust. The first antennal segment is strongly swollen in both sexes, bigger than second and third segments together, and very hairy,
especially in the male. The palpi are slightly swollen. The eyes of males touch
for a short distance, and the upper facets are greatly enlarged. The frons of the female
is broader.

Biology
The larvae are found in damp soil underneath plants and under mosses.

References

External links
 Fauna Europaea

Rhagionidae
Insects described in 1806
Brachyceran flies of Europe